"Numb" is a song by American rock band Linkin Park. It was released as the third single from their second studio album, Meteora (2003), and is the closing track on the album. One of Linkin Park's most well-known and critically acclaimed songs, "Numb" topped the Billboard Alternative Songs chart for 12 weeks. The song spent six weeks at the top of the chart in 2003 and six weeks in 2004. The song also spent three weeks atop the Billboard Hot Mainstream Rock Tracks chart and peaked at number 11 on the Billboard Hot 100.

The song was remixed as "Numb/Encore", a collaboration between the band and American rapper Jay-Z. It was a massive hit for both artists that was featured on the album Collision Course and earned them the Grammy Award for Best Rap/Sung Collaboration. "Numb" was ranked number 95 on Rhapsody's list of the "Top 100 Tracks of the Decade".

In January 2011, "Numb" was released in a Linkin Park DLC pack for Rock Band 3. In August 2020, it, together with several other Linkin Park songs, was added in an update to Beat Saber. The song is also featured on the dance rhythm game Just Dance 2023 Edition.

On March 15, 2022, "Numb" became the second song by the band after "In the End" to surpass 1 billion streams on Spotify.

Music video 
Directed by band member Joe Hahn, the indoor scenes of the music video are set in St. Vitus Cathedral in Prague, Czech Republic as are the outdoor scenes. The school interiors, the classroom, the corridor and the outside playground are set in Johannes Kepler Grammar School (Gymnázium Jana Keplera) in Prague. The bridge scenes were all shot on Prague's famed Charles Bridge. The video was shot over June 2003, even though vocalist Chester Bennington was suffering from severe abdominal and back pains at the time, so the band's performance was filmed afterwards in a matching cathedral in Los Angeles. The final video was released within the release of the single early September 2003.

The video follows the domestic and social problems faced during a day in the life of an unpopular outcast young female student (portrayed by Briana Evigan). The girl apparently spends much of her time drawing pictures, revealing that she probably has dreams of becoming an artist. She is largely shunned and ridiculed at school, considering that when she is told off by the lecturer for drawing in class everybody laughs at her and teases her, when she trips on the stairs nobody stops to help her up, and that when she tries to join a group of girls at a lunch table they immediately get up and leave. There are also self-inflicted cut marks on her arms, which spell out "NUMB". During the song's climax, she is shown in her room, as she ties up her hair with a paintbrush, and throws paint at a canvas in anger. At the end, she runs into the church that the band was playing in, almost as if she heard them, only to find the band is still there.

In November 2018, the song became the band's first video to reach over one billion views on their YouTube channel. As of December 2022, the music video for "Numb" has over 1.9 billion views and 12 million likes on the platform.

Commercial performance 
The track became one of Linkin Park's most critically acclaimed songs, as well as one of their most commercially successful, peaking at number 11 on the US Billboard Hot 100 on February 24, 2004, and spending 3 weeks on top of the Mainstream Rock Tracks and 12 weeks on top of the Modern Rock Tracks. "Numb" was the 33rd best performing single on the Billboard Hot 100 during 2004 and it was listed at number 15 in the alternative songs decade end chart. As of June 2014, the song has sold 2,036,000 copies in the US. The song re-entered at #35 in July 2017 after the death of Chester Bennington, all together with "In the End" charting at number 37 and their new song "Heavy" peaking at number 45.

The song was also successful in Oceania, peaking at number 10 in Australia and number 13 in New Zealand. "Numb" is also their longest running single in France, spending 23 weeks on the chart, peaking at number 19; it was also successful in Greece, topping the singles chart. However, it only ranked for one week in Italy and on the Belgian Singles Chart.

Track listing

In other media and covers 
In 2017, an online meme mashing up "Numb" with the Seinfeld theme song was released.
The song is used by English UFC fighter Paul Kelly and Brazilian fighter Demian Maia as an entrance song.
Nicki Minaj remixed the song for her debut mixtape, retitled as 'Encore '07'.
The Swedish metal band Dead by April released a cover of the song on YouTube after Chester's passing in 2017.
Machine Gun Kelly covered the song on YouTube after Bennington's passing in 2017.

Personnel 
 Chester Bennington – lead vocals
 Mike Shinoda – piano, vocals
 Brad Delson – guitars
 Rob Bourdon – drums
 Dave "Phoenix" Farrell – bass guitar
 Joe Hahn – turntables, samplers

Charts

Weekly charts

Year-end charts

Certifications

Release history

References

External links 
 

2003 songs
2003 singles
2000s ballads
Linkin Park songs
Songs written by Mike Shinoda
Warner Records singles
Songs about bullying
Number-one singles in Greece
American pop rock songs
Emo songs